Louis De Votie Newton (27 April 1892 – 3 June 1986) was President of the Southern Baptist Convention (1947–1948) in the United States, Baptist preacher, and author, as well as vice president of the Baptist World Alliance.

Biography

Newton was born in Screven County, Georgia on April 27, 1892. He was raised on his parents' farm, and in July 1902 was baptized in a stream near Union Baptist Church.
He graduated from Mercer University in 1913 and then taught history at the university before earning a master's degree in journalism from Columbia University.
He joined the U.S. Army in 1917, and taught soldiers at camps near Macon during the First World War.
From 1920 to 1929 Newton edited the Georgia Baptist Convention’s Christian Index newspaper.  In 1936 Newton started writing a daily column titled "Good Morning" for the Atlanta Constitution and Savannah Morning News, while writing weekly columns for the Christian Index. He also published several books. Newton broadcast a radio show on WGST-Atlanta from 1929 until his death.

Religious life

Newton became pastor of Druid Hills Baptist Church in Atlanta, Georgia in 1929.
He initially resisted the offer of this position since he was only a layman, but was persuaded to accept and was ordained on April 20, 1929, just before his thirty-seventh birthday.
In 1943 he was a co-founder of the Georgia Temperance League.
In 1946, soon after the end of the Second World War, he was elected president of the Southern Baptist Convention, serving from 1947 to 1948.

In the summer of 1946 Joseph Stalin invited Newton to visit Russia on a five-week tour, to meet with leaders of the Union of Evangelical Christians-Baptists of Russia and investigate the status of its two million Baptists. Newton reported that the churches were open seven days a week, carrying on highly active programs of religious instruction, culture and recreation. 
He received a certain amount of criticism for the positive statements about Russia he made on his return, with some accusing him of communist sympathies, others of naivety and still another of "intellectual inadequacy."
 
Newton was president of the Georgia Baptist Convention in 1950 and 1951.
Later he was vice president of the Baptist World Alliance.
He retired as pastor of the Druid Hills Baptist Church in October 1968.

Death and legacy
Newton died of pneumonia in 1986 at the age of 94.

He is the namesake of Newton Hall, a large chapel on the Mercer University campus in Macon.

See also
List of Southern Baptist Convention affiliated people
Southern Baptist Convention
Southern Baptist Convention Presidents

Bibliography

References 

1892 births
1986 deaths
Southern Baptist ministers
People from Screven County, Georgia
Deaths from pneumonia in Georgia (U.S. state)
Druid Hills, Georgia
Southern Baptist Convention presidents
20th-century Baptist ministers from the United States